Common goods (also called common-pool resources) are defined in economics as goods that are rivalrous and non-excludable. Thus, they constitute one of the four main types based on the criteria:
 whether the consumption of a good by one person precludes its consumption by another person (rivalrousness)
 whether it is possible to prevent people (consumers) who have not paid for it from having access to it (excludability)
As common goods are accessible by everybody, they are at risk of being subject to overexploitation which leads to diminished availability if people act to serve their own self-interests.

Characteristics of common goods 
Common-pool resources are sufficiently large that it is difficult, but not impossible, to define recognized users and exclude other users altogether. Based on the criteria, common goods are:
 rivalrous: When one person consumes a good, another person is unable to subsequently consume that good and the overall stock of the good decreases. For example, when a fisherman catches a fish, no other fisherman is able to catch that fish.
 non-excludable: There is no possibility to exclude anybody from consumption of this good. 
Common goods can be institutions, facilities, constructions or nature itself. As long as it can be used by all members of society and not privately consumed by specific individuals or not all parts of society as private goods.

For common goods to be able to exist, in most cases payment of taxes is needed, as common goods are socially beneficial and everyone is interested in satisfy some considered basic necessities. As the government is commonly the agent who drives expenses to create common goods, the community pays an amount in exchange.

A society requires to have certain elements in order to succeed in the creation of common goods. Developed countries normally share those elements such as being a democracy and having basic rights and freedoms, a transportation system, cultural institutions, police and public safety, a judicial system, an electoral system, public education, clean air and water, safe and ample food supply, and national defense.

A common problem with the common goods today is that its existence affects society as a whole, so we must all make a sacrifice to create a common good. Society then have to choose between the interest of a few or the sacrifice of all.

Accomplishing a common good has consistently required a level of individual penance. Today, the compromises and forfeits important for the benefit of everyone regularly include paying taxes, tolerating individual bother, or surrendering certain advantages and cultural beliefs. While infrequently offered intentionally, these penances and compromises are generally joined into laws and public policy. Some cutting-edge instances of the benefit of all and the penances associated with accomplishing them are:

 Public Infrastructure Improvement: Usually the improvement of highways, water, sewer and power lines require the addition or increase of taxes, as well as the use of eminent domain.
 Civil Rights and Racial Equality: Even though inequality and racial disparities must move in the way to seize to exist, vestiges of privileges for a fraction of the society still exist and had been progressively eliminated by new laws.
 Environmental Quality: New laws and movements increase regarding the global environmental problem as a healthy environment benefit the common good and now it isn't going to be only a matter of a few.

History 
Despite its growing importance in modern society, the concept of the common good was first mentioned more than two thousand years ago in the writings of Plato, Aristotle, and Cicero. Regardless the time period Aristotle described the problem with common goods accurately: “What is common to many is taken least care of, for all men have greater regard for what is their own than for what they possess in common with others.” As early as the second century AD, the Catholic religious tradition defined the common good as “the sum of those conditions of social life which allow social groups and their individual members relatively thorough and ready access to their own fulfilment.”

In later centuries, philosophers, politicians and economists have referred to the concept of common good such as Jean-Jacques Rousseau, in his 1762 book "The Social Contract". The Swiss philosopher, writer, and political theorist argues that in successful societies, the “general will” of the people will always be directed toward achieving the collectively agreed common good. Rousseau contrasts the will of all—the total of the desires of each individual—with the general will—the “one will which is directed towards their common preservation and general well-being.” Rousseau further contends that political authority, in the form of laws, will be viewed as legitimate and enforceable only if it is applied according to the general will of the people and directed toward their common good.

Adam Smith also referred to common goods in his book “The Wealth of Nations”, as individuals moved by an “invisible hand” to satisfy their own interests serve the purpose of the common good. He advocated that in order to realize common interests, society should shoulder common responsibilities to ensure that the welfare of the most economically disadvantaged class is maintained.

This view was later shared by the American philosopher John Rawls, who in his book “Theory of Justice” believes that public good is the core of a healthy moral, economic and political system. Rawls defined the common interest as “certain general conditions that are … equally to everyone's advantage.”

In this case, Rawls equates the common interest with the combination of social conditions for the equal sharing of citizenship, such as basic freedom and fair economic opportunities.

Examples 
Congested roads - Roads may be considered either public or common resources. Road is public good whenever there is no congestion, thus the use of the road does not affect the use of someone else. However, if the road is congested, one more person driving the car makes the road more crowded which causes slower passage. In other words, it creates a negative externality and road becomes common good.

Clean water and air - Climate stability belongs to classic modern examples. Water and air pollution is caused by market negative externality. Water flows can be tapped beyond sustainability, and air is often used in combustion, whether by motor vehicles, smokers, factories, wood fires.  In the production process these resources and others are changed into finished products such as food, shoes, toys, furniture, cars, houses and televisions.

Fish stocks in international waters - Oceans remain one of the least regulated common resources. When fish are withdrawn from the water without any limits being imposed just because of their commercial value, living stocks of fish are likely to be depleted for any later fishermen. This phenomenon is caused by no incentives to let fish for others. To describe situations in which economic users withdraw resources to secure short-term gains without regard for the long-term consequences, the term tragedy of the commons was coined. For example, forest exploitation leads to barren lands, and overfishing leads to a reduction of overall fish stocks, both of which eventually result in diminishing yields to be withdrawn periodically.

Other natural resources - Another example of a private exploitation treated as a renewable resource and commonly cited have been trees or timber at critical stages, oil, mined metals, crops, or freely accessible grazing.

Debates about sustainability can be both philosophical and scientific.  However, wise-use advocates consider common goods that are an exploitable form of a renewable resource, such as fish stocks, grazing land, etc., to be sustainable in the following two cases:

 As long as demand for the goods withdrawn from the common good does not exceed a certain level, future yields are not diminished and the common good as such is being preserved as a 'sustainable' level.
 If access to the common good is regulated at the community level by restricting exploitation to community members and by imposing limits to the quantity of goods being withdrawn from the common good, the tragedy of the commons may be avoided.  Common goods that are sustained through an institutional arrangement of this kind are referred to as common-pool resources.

Tragedy of the commons 
Tragedy of commons is a problem in economics in which everybody has an incentive to use a resource at the expense of everyone else who uses it, with no way of preventing anyone from consuming it. Generally, the resource in question is without barriers to entry and is demanded in excess of its supply, leading to depletion of the resource.

Example 
For example, imagine there are several shepherds, each with their own flock of sheep, who have access to a communal field which they all use for grazing. As the sheep graze unhindered, they deplete the overall stock of grass in the field and there is less for other sheep to consume. The tragedy is that eventually the field will become barren and will be no use to any of the shepherds.

Possible solutions 
Assigning property rights is one possible solution to the problem. This involves essentially converting what was a common-pool resource into a private good. This would prevent that over-consumption of the good as the owner(s) of the good would have an incentive to regulate their consumption in order to keep the stock of that good at a healthy level.

Next solution is government intervention.  Right to use the land can be allocated, the number of sheep in every herd can be regulated or externality made by sheep can be internalized by taxing sheep.

Collective solutions can also be reached to solve the problem. Before English enclosure laws were enacted, there were agreements in place between lords and rural villagers to overcome this problem. Practices such as seasonal grazing and crop rotation regulated land use. Over-using the land resulted in enforcebale sanctions.

Common goods and normal goods 
Normal goods are goods that experience an increase in demand as the income of consumers increases.. The demand function of a normal good is downward sloping, which means there is an inverse relationship between the price and quantity demanded. In other words, price elasticity of demand is negative for normal goods. Common goods mean that demand and price change in the opposite direction. If something is a normal goods, then the consumer's demand for the goods and the consumer's income level change in the same direction. At this time, the substitution effect and income effect will strengthen each other, so the price change will lead to the opposite direction of demand change. Then the goods must be a common goods, so the normal goods must be a common goods.

Other goods

In addition to common goods, there are three other kinds of economic goods, including public goods, private goods, and club goods. Common goods that a businessman gives a thumbs up can include international fish stocks and other goods. Most international fishing areas have no limit on the number of fish that can be caught. Therefore, anyone can fish as he likes, which makes the good things not excluded. However, if there are no restrictions, fish stocks may be depleted when other fishermen arrive later. This means that fish populations are competitive. Other common commodities include water and game animals.

Tragedy of the commons 
The tragedy of the commons was originally mentioned in 1833 by the Victorian economist William Forster Lloyd, who was a member of the Royal Society . He offered the example of a hypothetical tract of shared grazing land, in which all of the villagers brought their cows to this common grazing space, resulting in overgrazing and the depletion of the resource(Lloyd, 1833). Individuals may theoretically limit their use in order to avoid depleting a shared resource, if they so chose. However, there is a problem with free riders. In situations where people rely on others to reduce their productivity. The result of everyone taking advantage of the system and making the most of it is a scenario of over-consumption.

See also 
 Common-pool resource
 Social goods
 Social trap
 Somebody else's problem
 Stone Soup – a story opposite the tragedy of the commons
 Tragedy of the anticommons
 Tyranny of small decisions
Tragedy of commons
Game theory
Public good

References

Citations

Bibliography 

Goods (economics)

fr:Bien commun